Shchipino is a rural locality (a village) in Sukhonskoye Rural Settlement, Mezhdurechensky District, Vologda Oblast, Russia. The population was 31 as of 2002.

Geography 
Shchipino is located 12 km southeast of Shuyskoye (the district's administrative centre) by road. Peshkovo is the nearest rural locality.

References 

Rural localities in Mezhdurechensky District, Vologda Oblast